Union Pacific 844, also known as the "Living Legend", is a class "FEF-3" 4-8-4 "Northern" type steam locomotive owned and operated by the Union Pacific Railroad for its heritage fleet. Built in December 1944 by the American Locomotive Company (ALCO) of Schenectady, New York, No. 844 is one of four surviving FEF Series locomotives and the only one in operation.

The locomotive operated in revenue service until 1959. It was stored while awaiting scrapping, along with the rest of the UP steam locomotive fleet. In 1960, railroad leaders recognized the benefits of having a steam program and retained No. 844 for special activities, the kernel of what has become the Union Pacific's heritage fleet. Today, it is one of UP's oldest serving locomotives and the only steam locomotive owned by a North American Class I railroad that has never been retired.

History

Revenue service
In 1944, Union Pacific and the American Locomotive Company (ALCO) collaborated on the FEF-3, a class of 10 locomotives designed to pull passenger trains at 90 mph. The FEF-3 could reach and regularly run at 120 mph; one locomotive reportedly pulled a 1,000-ton passenger train at 100 mph. All FEF classes were considered by the Union Pacific to be capable of producing between 4,000 and 5,000 drawbar horsepower.

The FEF-3 class represented the apex of dual-service steam locomotive development; funds and research were being concentrated into the development of diesel-electric locomotives. Originally designed to burn coal, they were converted to run on fuel oil in 1946. Like the earlier FEF-1 and FEF-2 classes, the FEF-3 locomotives were ultimately reassigned to freight service.

UP 844 was the last steam locomotive delivered to the Union Pacific Railroad, constructed as a member of the FEF-3 class of 4-8-4 "Northern" type locomotives. Upon its entry into service, the locomotive spent most of its career pulling a variety of passenger trains, such as the Overland Limited, Los Angeles Limited, Portland Rose and Challenger. From 1957 to 1959, UP 844 was reassigned to fast freight service in Nebraska when diesel-electric locomotives took over passenger service.

After commercial steam operations ended in 1959, the 844 and the rest of the FEF-3 class was placed into storage. Saved from scrapping in 1960, No. 844 was chosen for rebuilding and is now used on company and public excursion trains, along with hauling revenue freight trains during ferry moves.

Excursion service
Since 1960, No. 844 has run hundreds of thousands of miles as Union Pacific's publicity locomotive. The locomotive often pulled the annual Denver Post-sponsored Cheyenne Frontier Days train that ran round-trip from Cheyenne to Denver every July before it was discontinued in early 2019.

It appeared at Expo '74 in Spokane, Washington; the 1978 dedication of the Utah State Railroad Museum in Ogden, Utah; the 1984 World's Fair in New Orleans; and the 50th anniversary celebration of Los Angeles Union Passenger Terminal in 1989, when it performed a side-by-side run with Southern Pacific 4449. On February 14, 1975, it pulled Amtrak's San Francisco Zephyr from Denver, Colorado to Cheyenne, Wyoming with a pair of EMD SDP40Fs. In 1981, it traveled to the opening of the California State Railroad Museum in Sacramento, along with Union Pacific 3985, which had recently been restored to operational condition.

Over the weekend of October 14, 1990, No. 844 led a procession of special trains from Kansas City Union Station to Abilene, Kansas for World War II veterans to celebrate the 100th birthday of U.S. President Dwight D. Eisenhower. The "Eisenhower Centennial Special" was composed of cars from the Union Pacific, Burlington Northern and Santa Fe Railway business fleets, with additional passenger cars provided by the Norfolk Southern and Chicago and North Western railroads. Also present in Abilene was General Eisenhower's command train, code-named "Bayonet", including the British A4 steam locomotive No. 60008 and communication and staff cars from WWII's European Theater of Operations.

After the end of the 1991 excursion season, 844 was put in the shop for a major running gear overhaul in addition to other repairs. During that time, 844 was repainted from the passenger greyhound scheme to the freight black. It emerged from the shop in 1996.

On June 21, 1997, on the way to the National Railway Historical Society (NRHS)'s annual convention in Salt Lake City, Utah, 844 and Union Pacific's Executive E units pulled 18 passenger cars on the Union Pacific's soon-to-close Tennessee Pass line, which included tracks on a narrow canyon shelf along the Arkansas River.

On June 24, 1999, while on display during RailFair '99, one of the 844's boiler tubes failed, and the locomotive was subsequently towed dead back to Cheyenne by the recently overhauled No. 3985. The tube was found to have been made of the wrong material during the overhaul in 1996, a discovery that prompted the replacement of the firebox in a complete overhaul that lasted from September 2001 to 2004. On September 9, 2004, the UP steam crew successfully test-fired the 4-8-4. It returned to operating service on November 10, 2004.

On May 18–19, 2007, No. 844 teamed with Southern Pacific 4449 to pull the "Puget Sound Excursion", a round trip from Tacoma to Everett on BNSF Railway tracks.

On June 25 and 26, 2010, it made an excursion trip to Milliken, Colorado's centennial celebration.

In September 2012, the No. 844 locomotive was used in "UP 150", a celebration of Union Pacific's 150th anniversary celebration, hosted by the California State Railroad Museum (CSRM). During that time, No. 844's tender derailed on a tightly-curved track from the Union Pacific's Martinez Subdivision to the CSRM. The tender was rerailed at 7:30 p.m.

In June 2013, the locomotive's gyrating Mars Light, installed in 1946, was removed because its mounting bolts had deteriorated. It was also announced that year that the 844 and 3985 would eventually be joined by a third steam locomotive: Big Boy No. 4014.

After the 2013 season, the locomotive was taken out of service for boiler work required by a change in the water treatment. It spent 2014 in Cheyenne, then received an early 15-year inspection the following year.

On June 16 and 17, 2016, the 844 was test-fired. On July 12, 2016, the Union Pacific Steam Team took the locomotive on a "break-in run" as a sort of all-systems check and dress rehearsal for its return to service. The run was described as a complete success. On July 23, 2016, it pulled the annual Cheyenne Frontiers Day excursion.

On October 13, 2016, the Union Pacific Steam Team started its 18-day "Trek To Tennessee" journey: the restored 844's first major trip.

In April 2017, No. 844 made its first run on the Oregon Short Line Railroad to celebrate the 92nd anniversary of the Boise Union Pacific Depot. Because of heavy snows and a wet spring, the trip was cut short and the engine had to run light across the Malad River because of a washed-out bridge.

In December 2018, Union Pacific requested Federal Railroad Administration (FRA) waivers to exempt UP Nos. 844, 3985 and 4014 from federal Positive Train Control (PTC) requirements; in February 2019, the FRA officials responded that such waivers were not needed.

On May 4, 2019, No. 844 participated in the inaugural run of the newly restored Big Boy No. 4014. The train departed the historic Cheyenne Depot following a christening ceremony for No. 4014. The two locomotives arrived at the Ogden Union Station on May 9 for the city's Heritage Festival. The two locomotives were on display at the station until May 12, when the return trip to Cheyenne began. They arrived at Cheyenne on May 19, concluding the first run of No. 4014 in excursion service.

As of January 2020, Nos. 844 and 4014 are the only two operational UP steam locomotives left on the active roster, following the retirement of No. 3985 from excursion service due to its poor mechanical condition. However, due to the COVID-19 pandemic in March 2020, UP cancelled all of its  2020 steam excursions and stated that Nos. 844 and 4014 would not operate for the 2020 operating season. UP eventually resumed excursion operations with No. 4014 in August and September 2021 and July 2022. No future excursions have thus far been scheduled for No. 844.

Union Pacific "8444"
From 1962 to 1989, the locomotive was numbered UP 8444 because the railroad had given the number 844 to an EMD GP30 locomotive. After the GP30 was retired from active service in June 1989, No. 8444 was renumbered back to 844. That GP30 is now owned by Nevada State Railroad Museum in Boulder City, Nevada, and operates periodically at the Nevada Southern Railroad Museum on excursion runs. There is now an EMD SD70ACe on the UP roster numbered 8444.

Accident
On July 21, 2018, while pulling the Cheyenne Frontier Days Special to Denver, Colorado, No. 844 struck and killed a pedestrian in Henderson, Colorado. It was reported that the pedestrian was trying to take photos of the train while standing too close to the tracks before she was hit. The train was stopped immediately following the accident.

Film history
UP 844 was documented in the 1981 film "Eighty Four Forty Four" by the Union Pacific Railroad. Some of those clips would be later used for the opening and closing credits of the PBS show Shining Time Station, which ran from 1989 until 1995 (including the four hour-long Family Specials).

UP 844 also appears in Extreme Trains in the episode "Steam Train", in which it pulled the Frontier Days special from Denver to Cheyenne.

UP 844 also makes an appearance in the 2nd Episode of the 3rd Season on the TLC TV series, Mostly True Stories?: Urban Legends Revealed.

In the 1990 PBS special Ghost Trains of the Old West, UP 8444, as it was numbered at the time of filming, is seen pulling a Union Pacific diesel locomotive and passenger train through Wyoming.

UP 844 (and several other restored steam locomotives) appear in the music video with the Pat Metheny Group's "Last Train Home".

The 2014 short film "Locomotive Song" features UP 844—particularly its running gear—accompanied by the song of the same name by boogie-woogie pianist Honey Piazza.

Gallery

References

Further reading

External links 

 UP Steam

0844
ALCO locomotives
4-8-4 locomotives
Individual locomotives of the United States
Articles containing video clips
Standard gauge locomotives of the United States
Railway locomotives introduced in 1944
Preserved steam locomotives of Wyoming